

Major bridges

References 
 Nicolas Janberg, Structurae.com, International Database for Civil and Structural Engineering

 Others references

See also 

 Transport in Libya
 List of aqueducts in the Roman Empire

External links 
 Highestbridges.com - Category: Bridges in Libya

Further reading 
 

Libya

b
Bridges